Håvard Holmefjord Lorentzen (/2hoːʋɑr 2hɔlməˌfjuːr 1luːrəntsn̩/; born 2 October 1992) is a Norwegian speed skater specialising in the 500, 1000 and 1500 m distances.

Career
Lorentzen has a 9th place from the World Cup races in Heerenveen in December 2011 as his best international senior result, and was awarded the gold medal for the 1000 m for the 2012 World Junior Championships after the original winner Pavel Kulizhnikov was disqualified for a doping offence. Lorentzen represents Fana IL. Football player Håkon Holmefjord Lorentzen is a younger brother of Håvard.

At the 2018 Winter Olympics in Pyeongchang, Lorentzen surpassed expectations by winning the gold medal at the 500 m event and silver in the 1000 m event.

Records

Personal records
Updated January 2023

World records
List of World Records set by Håvard Holmefjord Lorentzen.

Olympic records
List of Olympic Records set by Håvard Holmefjord Lorentzen.

World Cup

Overall in the World cup
Updated after the 2013/14 season.

References

External links
 
 
 

1992 births
Norwegian male speed skaters
Speed skaters at the 2014 Winter Olympics
Speed skaters at the 2018 Winter Olympics
Speed skaters at the 2022 Winter Olympics
Olympic speed skaters of Norway
Sportspeople from Bergen
Living people
Medalists at the 2018 Winter Olympics
Medalists at the 2022 Winter Olympics
Olympic medalists in speed skating
Olympic gold medalists for Norway
Olympic silver medalists for Norway
Olympic bronze medalists for Norway
World Sprint Speed Skating Championships medalists
World Single Distances Speed Skating Championships medalists
21st-century Norwegian people